Counterpoint for Six Valves is an album by American jazz trumpeters Don Elliott and Rusty Dedrick which was recorded in 1955 for the Riverside label. The album features six tracks that were originally recorded in 1955 and released as the 10-inch LP, Six Valves along with four additional tracks from 1956. This album was also reissued on the Jazzland label as Double Trumpet Doings.

Reception

Allmusic awarded the album 4 stars.

Track listing
All compositions by Dick Hyman except as indicated
 "Mine" (George Gershwin, Ira Gershwin) - 3:08    
 "Vampire Till Ready" - 5:03 originally released on 6 Valves   
 "Your Own Iron" - 5:01 originally released on 6 Valves     
 "It's Easy to Remember" (Lorenz Hart, Richard Rodgers) - 4:55 originally released on 6 Valves     
 "The Bull Speaks" - 3:20    
 "Dominick Seventh" - 5:08 originally released on 6 Valves     
 "Gargantuan Chant" - 4:41 originally released on 6 Valves     
 "When Your Lover Has Gone" (Einar Aaron Swan) - 5:07 originally released on 6 Valves     
 "Henry's Mambo" - 2:15    
 "Theme and Inner Tube" - 1:59  
Recorded at Reeves Sound Studios, New York City on March 16 & 17, 1955 (tracks 2-4 & 6-8) and April 23, 1956 (tracks 1, 5, 9 & 10)

Personnel 
Rusty Dedrick (tracks 1-3 & 5-10), Don Elliott (tracks 1–7, 9 & 10) - trumpet
Dick Hyman - piano (tracks 1-9)
Mundell Lowe - guitar (tracks 1-9)
Eddie Safranski - bass (tracks 1-9)
Don Lamond - drums (tracks 1-9)

References 

1956 albums
Don Elliott albums
Rusty Dedrick albums
Albums produced by Orrin Keepnews
Riverside Records albums
Albums arranged by Dick Hyman